The Super High Roller Bowl is a recurring high stakes No-Limit Hold'em poker tournament that takes place at venues across the world. 

The first edition of the event was held in July 2015 and featured a $500,000 buy-in, drawing a field of 43 players. Brian Rast won the inaugural tournament, earning $7,525,000. For its second year, the tournament was moved to May and the buy-in was lowered to $300,000. Entries increased to 49 and Rainer Kempe captured the first prize of $5,000,000. The third year would attract 56 entrants as Christoph Vogelsang defeated Jake Schindler to win the $6,000,000 first-place prize, and ensure back-to-back titles for Germany.

There would be three Super High Roller Bowls held during 2018, and in March, the first international stop of the series would take in place at the Babylon Casino in Macau, China. Justin Bonomo defeated Patrik Antonius and the 75-entrant field to win the HK$37,830,000 (~$4,823,077) first-place prize. In May, 48-entrants would play Super High Roller Bowl 2018, and Bonomo would become the first back-to-back champion when he defeated Daniel Negreanu heads-up to win the $5 million first-place prize. The fifth installment of the Super High Roller Bowl would take place in December as Isaac Haxton topped the 36-entrant field, and Alex Foxen heads-up, to win the $3,672,000 first-place prize.

The Super High Roller Bowl expanded to four new countries beginning in 2019 with the Aspers Casino in Stratford, England hosting Super High Roller Bowl London. Cary Katz topped the 12-entrant field to win the £2,100,000 (~$2,610,317) first-place prize. In November, Baha Mar Casino in The Bahamas hosted Super High Roller Bowl Bahamas, and attracted 51 entrants. Daniel Dvoress defeated Wai Leong Chan to win the $4,080,000 first-place prize. In February 2020, The Star Gold Coast hosted 16 entrants for Super High Roller Bowl Australia as Timothy Adams captured the AU$2,150,000 (~$1,446,112) first-place prize. Adams would become the second player to win back-to-back Super High Roller Bowl titles when in March 2020 he won Super High Roller Bowl Russia for $3,600,000 after defeating Vogelsang heads-up to top the 40-entrant field.

In June 2020, the first online Super High Roller Bowl would be held on partypoker and be a $102,000 buy-in. Justin Bonomo won his third Super High Roller Bowl title after he defeated Michael Addamo heads-up, and topped the 50-entrant field to win the $1,775,000 first-place prize.

The Super High Roller Bowl made its debut at the Merit Royal Hotel Casino & Spa in North Cyprus in August 2021. The buy-in was $250,000 and it attracted 41 entrants as Wiktor Malinowski defeated Ivan Leow heads-up to win the $3,690,000 first-place prize. In September, Super High Roller Bowl VI was held inside the PokerGO Studio and attracted 21 players as Michael Addamo denied Justin Bonomo his fourth Super High Roller Bowl title to collect the $3,402,000 first-place prize. 

The Super High Roller Bowl returned to the Merit Royal Hotel Casino & Spa in North Cyprus in April 2022 with a 32-entrant field creating a prize pool of $8,000,000. Jake Schindler defeated Paul Phua heads-up to win the $3,200,000 first-place prize. Super High Roller Bowl VII was held from inside the PokerGO Studio from October 5-7, 2022, with the 24 player field creating a prize pool of $7,200,000. Daniel Negreanu defeated Nick Petrangelo heads-up to win the $3,312,000 first-place prize; the largest win of his career and second biggest lifetime tournament score.

Footage from the tournaments including live streams and episodes can be found on PokerGO.

Tournaments

Results

Super High Roller Bowl I (2015)

 3-Day Event: July 2–4
 Buy-in: $500,000
 Number of Entries: 43
 Total Prize Pool: $21,500,000
 Number of Payouts: 7
 Winning Hand:

Super High Roller Bowl II (2016)

 4-Day Event: May 29-June 1
 Buy-in: $300,000
 Number of Entries: 49
 Total Prize Pool: $15,000,000
 Number of Payouts: 7
 Winning Hand:

Super High Roller Bowl III (2017)

 5-Day Event: May 28-June 1
 Buy-in: $300,000
 Number of Entries: 56
 Total Prize Pool: $16,800,000
 Number of Payouts: 7
 Winning Hand:

Super High Roller Bowl China (March 2018)

 3-Day Event: March 20–22
 Buy-in: $267,637
 Number of Entries: 75
 Total Prize Pool: $18,542,370
 Number of Payouts: 11
 Winning Hand:

Super High Roller Bowl IV (May 2018)

 4-Day Event: May 27-30
 Buy-in: $300,000
 Number of Entries: 48
 Total Prize Pool: $14,400,000
 Number of Payouts: 7
 Winning Hand:

Super High Roller Bowl V (December 2018)

 3-Day Event: December 17-19
 Buy-in: $300,000
 Number of Entries: 36
 Total Prize Pool: $10,800,000
 Number of Payouts: 7
 Winning Hand:

Super High Roller Bowl London (September 2019)

 2-Day Event: September 13-14
 Buy-in: $312,650
 Number of Entries: 12
 Total Prize Pool: $3,729,024
 Number of Payouts: 2
 Winning Hand:

Super High Roller Bowl Bahamas (November 2019)

 3-Day Event: November 16-18
 Buy-in: $250,000
 Number of Entries: 51
 Total Prize Pool: $12,750,000
 Number of Payouts: 8
 Winning Hand:

Super High Roller Bowl Australia (February 2020)

 2-Day Event: February 2-3
 Buy-in: $167,230
 Number of Entries: 16
 Total Prize Pool: $2,677,986
 Number of Payouts: 3
 Winning Hand:

Super High Roller Bowl Russia (March 2020)

 3-Day Event: March 13 - 15
 Buy-in: $250,000
 Number of Entries: 40
 Total Prize Pool: $10,000,000
 Number of Payouts: 6
 Winning Hand:

Super High Roller Bowl Online (June 2020)

 2-Day Event: June 1 - 2
 Buy-in: $102,000
 Number of Entries: 50
 Total Prize Pool: $5,000,000
 Number of Payouts: 7
 Winning Hand:

Super High Roller Bowl Europe (August 2021)

 3-Day Event: August 30-September 1
 Buy-in: $250,000
 Number of Entries: 41
 Total Prize Pool: $10,250,000
 Number of Payouts: 6
 Winning Hand:

Super High Roller Bowl VI (September 2021)

 3-Day Event: September 27-29
 Buy-in: $300,000
 Number of Entries: 21
 Total Prize Pool: $6,300,000
 Number of Payouts: 5
 Winning Hand:

Super High Roller Bowl Europe (April 2022)

 3-Day Event: April 13-15
 Buy-in: $250,000
 Number of Entries: 32
 Total Prize Pool: $8,000,000
 Number of Payouts: 5
 Winning Hand:

Super High Roller Bowl VII (October 2022)

 3-Day Event: October 5-7
 Buy-in: $300,000
 Number of Entries: 24
 Total Prize Pool: $7,200,000
 Number of Payouts: 4
 Winning Hand:

References

External links
Official website

Poker in Las Vegas
Television shows about poker
Recurring events established in 2015